Metarctia is a genus of moths in the family Erebidae and subfamily Arctiinae. The genus was erected by Francis Walker in 1855.

Species

Taxonomy
Collocaliodes was established as a subgenus of Metarctia.

References

Przybyłowicz, Ł. & Bąkowski, M. (2011). "Anapisa monotonia Kiriakoff, 1963 – a junior synonym of Anapisa holobrunnea (Talbot, 1932), with new records of Arctiinae (Lepidoptera: Erebidae) from Ghana". Zootaxa. 3031: 54–60.

External links

 
Syntomini
Moth genera